"Look at Yourself" is a song by British progressive rock/hard rock band Uriah Heep, originally released in 1971 on their third studio album, Look at Yourself, and the same month as a single, the first by the band in the United Kingdom. It was written and sung by Ken Hensley.

According to Hensley, the reason that he took over the lead vocals on the recording was that the band's frontman David Byron had throat problems during the recording session. However, Byron sang lead vocals on the song during Uriah Heep's live performances.

"Look at Yourself" was later included on the band's first live album, Uriah Heep Live, and on their first compilation album, The Best of Uriah Heep.

The song was used in the first episode of the 2006 BBC series Life on Mars.

Covers
German power metal band Gamma Ray covered this song on their first studio album, Heading for Tomorrow (1990).
GrimSkunk covered "Look at Yourself" on their Grim Skunk album.

Personnel
 Ken Hensley – lead vocals, organ
 Mick Box – lead guitar, acoustic guitar
 Paul Newton – bass guitar
 Ian Clarke – drums
 David Byron – backing vocals

Charts

References

Uriah Heep (band) songs
1971 singles
Songs written by Ken Hensley
Bronze Records singles
1971 songs